Andrew Rogers (born 1 December 1956) is an English former professional footballer. Rogers, a midfielder, is most noted for playing for Plymouth Argyle in the 1980s. He also played for Peterborough United, Southampton, Reading and Southend United.

Playing career
Rogers began his career with local club Chatteris Town before being signed by Peterborough United in 1975. He was released in 1978 and spent a brief spell with non-league Hampton before joining Southampton in 1979. Rogers was signed by Plymouth Argyle in 1981 where he would be a prominent member of the first-team for the next four years, making 195 appearances in all competitions, scoring 19 goals. He featured for them in the 1983–84 FA Cup semi-final at Villa Park. He scored a remarkable goal in the quarter-finals against Derby County at the Baseball Ground, direct from a corner kick.

He was signed by Reading in the summer of 1985, where he would make 44 league appearances for the Elm Park side, scoring 5 goals, before spending a season with Southend United.

He saw out his career in non-league football, playing for Carshalton Athletic and then Farnborough Town.

After football
Rogers now works as a probation officer in Devon. His son Gabriel Rogers is a footballer for Torquay United.

References

1956 births
People from Chatteris
Living people
English footballers
Peterborough United F.C. players
Southampton F.C. players
Plymouth Argyle F.C. players
Reading F.C. players
Southend United F.C. players
Carshalton Athletic F.C. players
Farnborough F.C. players
English Football League players
Association football midfielders